Çayboyu is a village in Tarsus district of Mersin Province, Turkey. It is situated in Çukurova (Cilicia of the antiquity). The population of Çayboyu was 688 as of 2011. Situated in the fertile plains, farming is the major economic activity. Cotton and green house vegetables are the main crops. The village suffers from frequent floods from Berdan River.

References

Villages in Tarsus District